Vehmasmäki is a village in the town of Kuopio, Finland. The village has a population of about 500.

In Vehmasmäki there is an animal park which is open every day in the summer.

Kuopio
Villages in Finland